Calliostoma sakashitai is a species of sea snail, a marine gastropod mollusk in the family Calliostomatidae.

Some authors place this taxon in the subgenus Calliostoma (Tristichotrochus).

Description
The size of the shell varies between 6 mm and 13 mm.

Distribution
This marine species occurs off Japan and the Philippines.

References

 Higo, S., Callomon, P. & Goto, Y. (1999). Catalogue and bibliography of the marine shell-bearing Mollusca of Japan. Osaka. : Elle Scientific Publications. 749 pp.

External links
 

sakashitai
Gastropods described in 1994